Jack Gordon (born 25 September 1911) was an English footballer who played as a wing half for Rochdale, as well as non-league football for various other clubs, including Leeds United reserve team.

References 

English footballers
Boldon Community Association F.C. players
Leeds United F.C. players
Rochdale A.F.C. players
Queen of the South F.C. players
South Shields F.C. (1936) players
Jarrow F.C. players
Blyth Spartans A.F.C. players
1911 births

Year of death missing